Kansas City Trucking Co.  is a 1976 American gay pornographic film directed by Tim Kincaid, better known as Joe Gage. It is the first in what has come to be known as Gage's "Working Man Trilogy", continuing with 1978's El Paso Wrecking Corp. and concluding with 1979's L.A. Tool & Die, and stars Richard Locke, Steve Boyd and Jack Wrangler.

Plot 

Hank (Richard Locke), a trucker, turns out new hire Joe on a long haul to the West Coast. The men masturbate together while on the road and participate in an all-male orgy at a truckers' bunkhouse in Los Angeles. The film features several trucking related double-entendres such as "wide load", "heavy load" and "men at work".

Cast 

 Jack Wrangler as Jack
 Richard Locke as Hank
 Steve Boyd as Joe
 Maria Reina as Joe's Girl
 Dane Tremmel as Otis (as Dane Tremmell)
 Skip Sheppard as Billy
 Duff Paxton as Dan
 Bud Jaspar as Fred
 Kurt Williams as Desert Rat

Production 

The film was produced in San Francisco. The original version of the film included a "piss scene" not included in DVD releases as the result of distribution editing over the years, in which Richard Locke and Jack Wrangler were seen urinating on an unknown man, followed by Locke and Steve Boyd urinating on Wrangler.

Legacy 

In 2006, Adult Video News included the "Working Man Trilogy" in its list of the top ten most innovative, influential and "hottest" gay porn films.

Critical reception 

The Advocate called the film "one of the hottest gay porns ever made. TLA Video's contemporary review was also highly favorable, citing it as one of the most influential gay porn films.

DVD release 

The films comprising the "Working Man Trilogy" were restored and released on DVD by HIS Video.

References

Further reading

External links 
 

1970s pornographic films
1976 films
Gay pornographic films
Films directed by Joe Gage (Tim Kincaid)
Trucker films
1976 directorial debut films
Films shot in San Francisco
1970s English-language films